Alina Butaeva (born 9 December 2005) is a Georgian pair skater. With her former partner, Luka Berulava, she won two medals at the 2020 Winter Youth Olympics − bronze in pairs and gold in the team event.

Personal life 
Butaeva was born on 9 December 2005 in Kazan, Russia. She resides in Perm.

Career

Early years 
Butaeva began learning how to skate as a three-year-old, in 2008. She originally competed as a single skater, coached by Ksenia Ivanova in Kazan. Butaeva teamed up with Luka Berulava prior to the 2019–20 season to compete in pair skating for Georgia. The pair decided to train in Perm, coached by Pavel Sliusarenko and Alexei Menshikov.

2019–20 season: International junior debut 
Butaeva/Berulava made their debut for Georgia in September 2019, placing eighth at an ISU Junior Grand Prix (JGP) event in Poland and then sixth at JGP Croatia. Their results earned a spot for Georgia in the pairs' event at the 2020 Winter Youth Olympics. In November, they took bronze in the junior pairs' category at the Volvo Open Cup in Riga, Latvia. In December, they won the junior event at the Golden Spin of Zagreb.

In January 2020, Butaeva/Berulava competed at the 2020 Winter Youth Olympics in Lausanne, Switzerland. Ranked third in both segments, they won the bronze medal behind two pairs from Russia, Apollinariia Panfilova / Dmitry Rylov and Diana Mukhametzianova / Ilya Mironov. This was Georgia's first medal in the Winter Youth Olympic Games, and their tenth medal in the Youth Olympic Games overall. The pair also received a gold medal for their participation in the team event as part of Team Courage, composed also of Arlet Levandi from Estonia, Ksenia Sinitsyna from Russia, and ice dancers Utana Yoshida / Shingo Nishiyama from Japan.  Butaeva/Berulava finished the season at the 2020 World Junior Championships, where they placed seventh.

End of Partnership 

Butaeva / Beruleva did not compete during the 2020 - 21 season and in the 2021 - 2022 season, Beruelva was competing with a new partner, indicating the two had split.

Programs 
(with Berulava)

Competitive highlights 
JGP: Junior Grand Prix

Pairs with Berulava

Detailed results 
Small medals for short and free programs awarded only at ISU Championships.

With Berulava

Junior results

References

External links 

 

2005 births
Figure skaters at the 2020 Winter Youth Olympics
Female pair skaters from Georgia (country)
Living people
Sportspeople from Perm, Russia
Sportspeople from Kazan